St Nicholas' School is a private day school for girls in Church Crookham, a village at the southern edge of Fleet, Hampshire, England. The school educates girls from the age of 3 to 16, and boys from age 3 to 7.

History
St Nicholas' School was founded in 1935 and moved to its present 30-acre site in 1996. As the school grew, the original Victorian house has been extended, adapted and additional accommodation built. The school became a charitable trust in 1966. The school maintains the Christian ethos of its foundation, whilst welcoming pupils of all faiths and of none.

References

External links
School Website
Profile on the ISC website
St Nicholas' School Educational Trust Ltd - Charity Commission

Educational institutions established in 1935
Private schools in Hampshire
Girls' schools in Hampshire
Member schools of the Girls' Schools Association
1935 establishments in England